Pietro Paolo Tomasi, marchese Della Torretta (7 April 1873 – 4 December 1962) was an Italian politician and diplomat, and a member of the noble family of the Princes of Lampedusa.

Born in Palermo, he earned a degree in jurisprudence, entering soon into a diplomatic career. From 1910–1914 he led the cabinet of Italian Minister of Foreign Affairs, Antonino Paternò-Castello di San Giuliano. Just after the latter's death, in May 1913 Della Torretta was sent to Munich as Italian plenipotentiary in the days preceding the outbreak of World War I. He was also Ambassador to Petrograd 1917-1919 and served in the Italian delegation at the 1919 Paris Peace Conference.

From 1921–1922 he was Minister of Foreign Affairs in the cabinet of Ivanhoe Bonomi, having been elected as Senator of the Kingdom in 1921. He was Italian ambassador to the United Kingdom 1922-1927.

Hostile to Fascism from the start of Benito Mussolini's government, he became President of the Italian Senate on 20 July 1944, after the Fascist regime collapsed.

1873 births
1962 deaths
Politicians from Palermo
Presidents of the Italian Senate
Nobility from Palermo
Members of the Senate of the Kingdom of Italy
Ambassadors of Italy to the United Kingdom
19th-century Italian politicians
20th-century Italian politicians
Ambassadors of Italy to Austria
Ambassadors of Italy to the Soviet Union
Pietro